Grace Jane Gummer (born May 9, 1986) is an American actress. She received a Theatre World Award for her Broadway debut in the 2011 revival of Arcadia. Her television work includes recurring roles in The Newsroom and American Horror Story: Freak Show, and regular roles in Extant and Mr. Robot.

Early life 
Gummer was born in New York City to actress Meryl Streep and sculptor Don Gummer. She grew up in Los Angeles and Connecticut with her older siblings, musician Henry Wolfe Gummer and actress Mamie Gummer, and younger sister, model Louisa Jacobson.

Attended Vassar College, her mother's alma mater, and received a degree in Art History and Italian in 2008. At Vassar, she was involved in its collaborative theater group Woodshed Theater Ensemble and spent a year studying abroad in Bologna, Italy. During this period, Gummer worked as a docent at Dia:Beacon, as well as for costume designer Ann Roth and the Tirelli Costumi costume shop in Rome. She later interned for fashion designer Zac Posen's design department.

Career

2008–2010: Early career 
Gummer made her screen acting debut (billed as Jane Grey) in the 1993 film The House of the Spirits, as the younger version of her mother's character, Clara del Valle. She had her next professional acting job after graduating college; in 2008, she starred Off-Off-Broadway in Lukas Bärfuss's The Sexual Neuroses of Our Parents. She originally was asked to help with the play's costume design but ended up auditioning and getting cast in its lead role.

From 2010 until 2011, she starred as Anna Moore on the TeenNick show Gigantic, which premiered on October 8, 2010. She said that she used the show "as a platform to be able to launch [herself] forward." Gummer appeared in the 2010 film Meskada, in which she played the role of Nat Collins, before playing Abby in 2010's Bashert with Paulo Costanzo. In December 2010, Gummer played the role of Hero in a Los Angeles production of Much Ado About Nothing, opposite Helen Hunt. She also had a small role as a student in Julia Roberts' class in the 2010 film Larry Crowne, which was directed by Tom Hanks; she shared many scenes in Larry Crowne with future Mr. Robot castmate Rami Malek.

2011–2012: Broadway 
In the Spring of 2011, Gummer made her Broadway debut, performing the role of Chloë Coverly in the revival of Arcadia by Tom Stoppard at the Ethel Barrymore Theatre in New York. The following year, she acted in her second Broadway production, The Columnist, opposite John Lithgow.

Gummer appeared as Katie Rand on the NBC television series Smash on March 26, 2012, in the episode entitled "The Coup"; her character is a humanitarian attempting to bring peace to her divorcing parents, including her mother, played by Anjelica Huston.

2013–present: Prominence in television 
Beginning in 2013, Gummer began having more, and higher profile, roles on television, having been cast in a series of recurring and main parts. Gummer had a recurring role as FBI agent Paige Willis on the television series Zero Hour, which aired in the early Spring of 2013. During this time, she also joined the cast of the HBO series The Newsroom. Gummer appeared in ten episodes as journalist Hallie Shea, beginning with the second episode of Season 2 on July 21, 2013. Concurrently, she starred in the online miniseries Paloma for WIGS. She also had a supporting role in the 2013 Tommy Lee Jones film The Homesman. In November 2013, she made her first appearance in the American Horror Story franchise; the following year, she appeared in seven episodes as Penny in American Horror Story: Freak Show.

In 2014 and 2015, Gummer starred alongside Halle Berry on both seasons of the Steven Spielberg CBS show Extant. She was part of the main cast for both seasons of the show. She had a supporting role in 2014's Learning to Drive and the 2015 romantic comedy Jenny's Wedding. Following the cancellation of Extant, she had a small role in the 2016 HBO film Confirmation, which was concerned with the Anita Hill controversy, and had a recurring role portraying Nora Ephron in the Amazon series Good Girls Revolt; the show would premiere a year later in November 2016.

On January 29, 2016, it was announced that Gummer had joined the cast of the USA Network series Mr. Robot as a series regular in the role of FBI field agent Dominique "Dom" DiPierro. She appeared in the final three seasons of the show, which premiered in July 2016, October 2017, and October 2019, respectively.

Between filming seasons of Mr. Robot, Gummer acted in the comedy The Long Dumb Road and the action-thriller Beast of Burden in which she co-starred opposite Daniel Radcliffe; both films premiered in 2018. She also had a small role in the Billy Crystal film Standing Up, Falling Down, which premiered in Spring 2019.

Gummer also returned to theater during this time. She had a supporting role in the off-Broadway play Mary Page Marlowe, which began previews in June 2018. In Fall 2018, she filmed The Hot Zone for National Geographic, in which she appears in four of the six episodes; the show aired in Spring 2019. After filming the final season of Mr. Robot during the first half of 2019, Gummer joined the cast of The Public Theater's production of A Bright Room Called Day, which opened in November 2019.

Personal life 
Gummer speaks both English and Italian. She lives in Los Angeles.

On July 10, 2019, Gummer married musician Tay Strathairn, the son of actor David Strathairn. The couple separated on August 21, 2019, after 42 days of marriage. Gummer filed for divorce on March 23, 2020, in Los Angeles, and the divorce was finalized in August 2020.

On September 4, 2021, it was announced that Gummer married British-American musician and record producer Mark Ronson after one year of dating. On October 13, 2022, Gummer and Ronson announced that they are expecting their first child. Child born March 14, 2023

Filmography

Film

Television

Theater

References

External links 
 
 

1986 births
21st-century American actresses
Actresses from Connecticut
Actresses from New York City
American film actresses
American television actresses
Living people
Meryl Streep
Theatre World Award winners
Vassar College alumni